Ajan (also Romanized as Ājān) is a village in Jamabrud Rural District, in the Central District of Damavand County, Tehran Province, Iran. At the 2006 census, its population was 24, in 12 families.

References 

Populated places in Damavand County